Geoffrey Sumner (20 November 1908, Ilfracombe, Devon – 29 September 1989, Alderney, Channel Islands) was a British actor. As well as appearing in a number of films, he was also a commentator for British Movietone News.,

His parents were Edmund and Kathleen Marion (Brook). He married Gwen Williams Roberts, and they had three daughters.

In 1957 he played Major Upshot-Bagley in the first series of  The Army Game , broadcast by ITV Granada. He reprised the role in the 1958 film I Only Arsked!, based on the TV series.

A sample of "Train Sequence" ("This is a journey into sound") from the 1958 LP A Journey Into Stereo Sound was used by different artists like Eric B. & Rakim in their track "Paid in Full", Bomb the Bass ("Beat Dis"), Public Enemy ("Welcome to the Terrordome"), Anthrax ("Potters Field"), Handsome Boy Modeling School ("Holy Calamity (Bear Witness II)"), Luke Vibert ("Ambalek"), Gotye ("A Distinctive Sound") and Jauz x Marshmello ("Magic").

In September 1968 Sumner played Sir Lancelot Spratt in the BBC radio series of Doctor in the House, alongside Richard Briers.

Partial filmography

 Hold My Hand (1938) - Solicitor's Clerk (uncredited)
 Too Many Husbands (1938) - Captain Corrie
 Premiere (1938) - Captain Curry
 The Gang's All Here (1939) - Flats' Superintendent (uncredited)
 Lucky to Me (1939) - Fanshaw
"Nasti" News From Lord Haw-Haw (1939-1940) - Lord Haw Haw
 Yes, Madam? (1939) - Scoffin (uncredited)
 She Couldn't Say No (1940) - Announcer
 Law and Disorder (1940)
 Old Mother Riley in Society (1940) - George (Party Guest) (uncredited)
 General Election (1945) - narrator
 While the Sun Shines (1947) - A Peer
 Mine Own Executioner (1947) - Parkinson (uncredited)
 Easy Money (1948) - Nightclub Patron (segment The Night Club Story) (uncredited)
 The Perfect Woman (1949) - Well Dressed Man On Underground (uncredited)
 Helter Skelter (1949) - Humphrey Beagle
 Dark Secret (1949) - Jack Farrell
 Traveller's Joy (1950) - Lord Tilbrook
 The Dark Man (1951) - Major
 A Tale of Five Cities (1951) - Wingco
 Appointment with Venus (1951) - Major - Vet. Corps
 The Happy Family (1952) - Sir Charles Spanniell
 Top Secret (1952) - Pike
 Those People Next Door (1953) - F / Lt. Claude Kimberley
 Always a Bride (1953) - Teddy
 The Dog and the Diamonds (1953) - Mr. Gayford
 Don't Blame the Stork (1954) - BBC Reporter at Baby Show (uncredited)
 Doctor in the House (1954) - Forensic Lecturer (uncredited)
 Five Days (1954) - Chapter (uncredited)
 The Flying Eye (1955) - Colonel Audacious
 The Silken Affair (1956) - Minor Role (uncredited)
 I Only Arsked! (1958) - Major Upshott-Bagley
 Band of Thieves (1962) - The Governor
 Cul-de-sac (1966) - Christopher's Father
 That's Your Funeral (1972) - Lord Lieutenant
 Side by Side (1975) - Magistrate
 There Goes the Bride'' (1980) - Gerald Drimond (final film role)

References

External links

1908 births
1989 deaths
British male stage actors
British male film actors
British male television actors
People from Ilfracombe
20th-century British male actors